Fairlight II: A Trail of Darkness is an isometric 3D action-adventure game released by The Edge in 1986 for the ZX Spectrum. It is the sequel to Fairlight.

Plot

Isvar successfully retrieved the Book of Light in Fairlight, but was then tricked into delivering it to the Dark Lord, who is now using it to further torment the land of Fairlight. Isvar must penetrate the Dark Tower and recover the book so that it may be taken to its rightful owner.

Gameplay
The game is very similar to its predecessor, though it is larger with more locations to explore.

Reception
Sinclair User: "The Edge means business. Fairlight 2 is not for weekend adventurers. You're going to have to be up all night... Criticisms? Very few."

References

External links

1986 video games
ZX Spectrum games
Amstrad CPC games
Amstrad PCW games
Action-adventure games
Video games developed in Sweden
Video games set in castles
Video games with isometric graphics